Giuseppe Aquino  (born 11 July 1983) is an Italian footballer.

Biography
Born in Pompei, Campania, Aquino started his senior career at Tuscan club Fortis Juventus in Serie D (Italian top division of amateur football and fifth division of the pyramid until 2014). In 2006, he was signed by a Serie C2 club. In July 2007 he joined Monopoli. In 2008, he moved to another fourth division club Sangiustese; in January 2010 he was signed by San Marino Calcio. Since 2010 he returned to Serie D. (except 2011–12 with Lega Pro Seconda Divisione (ex–Serie C2) club Aprilia) He won promotion back to professional football in 2013 with Sambenedettese, however the club was not admitted.

Honours
 Serie D: 2013 (Sambenedettese)

References

External links
 Lega Serie B profile 
 AIC profile (data by football.it) 

Italian footballers
Vastese Calcio 1902 players
A.S.D. Victor San Marino players
Rimini F.C. 1912 players
A.S. Sambenedettese players
Serie C players
People from Pompei
Footballers from Campania
Association football defenders
1983 births
Living people
A.C. Sangiustese players